Donghui is a town in Lancang Lahu Autonomous County, Yunnan, China.

Administrative division
As of 2016, the town is divided into six villages: 
Donggang
Ayong
Banli
Huinong
Nanweng
Gaixin

History
In the Qing dynasty (1644–1911), it came under the jurisdiction of Mengbin Tusi.

During the Republic of China (1912-1949), it belonged to Donglang Township.

In 1949, the Donghui District was set up. It was renamed Hongwei Commune in 1969 and was changed to Donghui Commune in 1972. It was incorporated as a township in 1988. On December 28, 2012, it was upgraded to a town.

Geography
It lies at the southwestern of Lancang Lahu Autonomous County, bordering Menglian Dai, Lahu and Va Autonomous County to the west, Nuofu Township to the south, Laba Township to the north, and Menglang Town to the east.

The Dongjiao River, Nanhong River and Nange River flow through the town.

Economy
The region's economy is based on agriculture and pig-breeding. Significant crops include grains, corns, and buckwheats.

Demographics

As of 2018, the National Bureau of Statistics of China estimates the town's population now to be 13,487.

Transportation
The Provincial Highway S309 passes across the town northeast to southwest.

References

Bibliography

Towns of Pu'er City
Divisions of Lancang Lahu Autonomous County